Nighthawk is an unincorporated community on the Similkameen River in Okanogan County, Washington, United States of America. It was named for a nearby (and now-closed) mine. Another source says that it was named after the nighthawks common to the area.

Description
Nighthawk is a (mostly former) logging area along Loomis–Oroville Highway west-northwest of Oroville, Washington.  Just north of Nighthawk is the Nighthawk–Chopaka Border Crossing, a 9 am – 5 pm Canada–US border crossing. Nighthawk is located along the former Great Northern Railroad (now BNSF).  The town of Nighthawk used to be a booming mine town at the turn of the 20th century with hotels and a burlesque house, but now only has a population of about five people.

The border crossing is usually known as "the Nighthawk crossing" on the Canadian side, though the official name of the Canadian-side locality is Chopaka.

Climate

References

Unincorporated communities in Washington (state)
Unincorporated communities in Okanogan County, Washington
Ghost towns in Washington (state)
Populated places in the Okanagan Country